The 1976 Indonesian Grand Prix was a motor race held at the Ancol Jaya Circuit, Jakarta, Indonesia on 24 October 1976. It was the inaugural Indonesian Grand Prix. The race was Round 3 of the 1976 Rothmans International Far East Series, which was open to Formula Atlantic cars.

There were 14 entries in total, but only 12 drivers started the race. The race was won by John MacDonald, driving a Ralt RT1. He also set the fastest lap of the race, in a time of 1:44.6.

Race results

References

Indonesian Grand Prix
Indonesian Grand Prix
Grand Prix
October 1976 sports events in Asia